The 1988 Syracuse Orangemen football team represented Syracuse University in the 1988 NCAA Division I-A football season. The Orangemen were led by eighth-year head coach Dick MacPherson and played their home games at the Carrier Dome in Syracuse, New York. They were invited to the 1989 Hall of Fame Bowl, where they defeated LSU.

Schedule

References

Syracuse
Syracuse Orange football seasons
ReliaQuest Bowl champion seasons
Syracuse Orangemen football